The Philippines participated at the 2010 Asian Games in Guangzhou, China from 12 to 27 November 2010.

Medalists

Gold

Silver

Bronze

Multiple

Medal summary

Medal by sports

Aquatics

Diving
13 athletes (including swimming and diving)

Swimming

Men

Women

Archery

2 athletes

Athletics

7 athletes

Men's 3000 Steeplechase

Rene Herrera - 9:02.93 min 8th

Men's Hammerthrow

Arniel Ferrer - 58.06 m 9th

Men's Javelin Throw

Danilo Fresnido - 70.35 m 10th

Men's Long Jump

Henry Dagmil - 7.52 m 6th

Men's Marathon

Eduardo Buenavista

Women's Javelin Throw

Rosie Villarito - 48.87 m 9th

Women's Long Jump

Marestella Torres- 6.49 m 4th

Basketball

12 athletes

Men's Basketball Team

Group B

Group F

Board Game - Chess

6 athletes

Men's Individual

Board Game - Xiangqi

2 athletes

Men's Individual

Bowling

12 athletes

Men

Boxing

6 athletes (including 1 female boxer)

Canoeing and Kayak Sprint

2 athletes

Men's Canoe Single 1000m

Dany Fuenlas

Men's Canoe Single 200m

Men's Kayak Single 1000m

Alex Generalo

Men's Kayak Single 200m

Alex Generalo

Cue Sports

14 athletes

Men's

Women's

Men's Snooker Singles

Benjamin Guevarra Jr.

Marlon Manalo

Women's 6-Red Snooker Team

Floriza Andal

Mary Ann Basas

Zemonette Oryan

Cycling - Road

4 athletes

Men's Individual Road Race

Lloyd Lucien Reynante

Irish Valenzuela

Men's Individual Time Trial

Lloyd Lucien Reynante

Women's Individual Road Race

Baby Marites Bitbit

Women's Individual Time Trial

Baby Marites Bitbit

Cycling - Track

3 Athletes plus Baby Marites Bitbit

Men's Points Race

John Renee Mier

George Oconer

Women's Points Race

Baby Marites Bitbit

Women's Sprint

Apryl Jessica Eppinger

Dancesport

12 athletes

Dragon Boat

Philippine Dragon Boat Team won't be competing in the 2010 Guangzhou Asian Games. The Philippine Olympic Committee denied the appeal of the paddlers and insisted that the team is not ready for the said competition.

Men's 1000m Straight Race

Philippine Men's Dragon Boat Team

24 Man Team

Men's 500m Straight Race

Philippine Men's Dragon Boat Team

24 Man Team

Men's 250m Straight Race

Philippine Men's Dragon Boat Team

24 Man Team

Women's 1000m Straight Race

Philippine Women's Dragon Boat Team

24 Man Team

Women's 500m Straight Race

Philippine Women's Dragon Boat Team

24 Man Team

Women's 250m Straight Race

Philippine Women's Dragon Boat Team

24 Woman Team

Fencing

2 athletes

Men's Individual Sabre

Walbert Mendoza

Women's Individual Foil

Jaime Nicanor

Golf

7 athletes

Men's Individual

Jerson Balasabas

Mhark Fernando

Miguel Luis Tabuena

Men's team

Jhonnel Ababa

Jerson Balasabas

Mhark Fernando

Miguel Luis Tabuena

Women's Individual

Dottie Ardina

Chihiro Ikeda

Maria Imelda Isabel Piccicio

Women's team

Dottie Ardina

Chihiro Ikeda

Maria Imelda Isabel Piccicio

Rhythmic Gymnastics

1 athlete

Women's team

Maria Victoria Alicia Recinto

Judo

6 athletes

Men

Repechage

Women

Repechage

Karate

4 athletes

Men's -67 kg

Rolando Lagman Jr.

Men's Individual Kata

Noel Espinosa

Women's -50 kg

Mae Soriano

Women's -55 kg

Ma. Marna Pabillore

Rowing

3 athletes

Lightweight Men's Double Sculls

Roque Abala Jr.

Alvin Amposta

Lightweight Men's Single Sculls

Benjamin Tolentino

Sailing

3 athletes

Men's Double Handed Dinghy 470

Lester Troy Tayong

Emerson Villena

Men's RS:X

Reneric Moreno

Sepaktakraw

3 athletes

Men's Double

Jason Huerte

Marbie Quirante

Metodio Suico Jr.

Shooting

9 athletes

Men's 50m Rifle 3 Positions

Jayson Valdez

Men's Trap

Eric Ang

Jethro Dionisio

Hagen Alexander Topacio

Softball

15 athletes

Philippine Women's Softball Team

Soft Tennis

10 athletes

Men's team

Women's team

Men's doubles

Jhomar Arcilla

Joseph Arcilla

Giovanni Pietro Mamawal

Mikoff Manduriao

Men's singles

Joseph Arcilla

Samuel Noguit

Women's doubles

Deena Rose Cruz

Divina Grace Escala

Cheryl Macasera

Josephine Paguyo

Women's singles

Cheryl Macasera

Noelle Conchita Corazon Zoleta

Mixed doubles

Squash

2 athletes

Women's Individual

Jemyca Aribado

Yvonne Alyssa Dalida

Tennis

4 athletes

Men's doubles

Johnny Arcilla

Ruben Gonzales Jr.

Treat Conrad Huey

Cecil Mamiit

Men's singles

Treat Conrad Huey

Cecil Mamiit

Men's team

Taekwondo

12 athletes

Men's Under 63kg

Tshomlee Go

Men's Under 68kg

Jeffrey Figueroa

Men's Under 74kg

Samuel Thomas Harper Morrison

Men's Under 80kg

Marlon Avenido

Women's Under 49kg

Jyra Marie Lizardo

Women's Under 53kg

Jade Zafra

Women's Under 57kg

Karla Jane Alava

Women's Under 62kg

Maria Camille Manalo

Women's Under 73kg

Kirstie Elaine Alora

Triathlon

2 athletes

Men's Individual

Neil Catiil	

Nikko Bryan Huelgas

Weightlifting

2 athletes

Men's 56 kg

Nestor Colonia

Women's 58 kg

Hidilyn Diaz

Wrestling

4 athletes

Men's Freestyle 55 kg

Jerry Angana

Men's Freestyle 66 kg

Jimmy Angana

Men's Greco-Roman 55 kg

Margarito Angana Jr.

Women's Freestyle 48 kg

Maribel Jambora

Wushu

7 athletes

Men's

Women's

References

Nations at the 2010 Asian Games
2010
Asian Games